is a private university in Sendagi, Bunkyo-ku, Tokyo, Japan.

History
In 1876, Tai Hasegawa established a medical school in Tokyo. At that time, the Japanese government and the Ministry of Education only permitted one medical school: the University of Tokyo School of Medicine. 

During the Meiji era, people who wanted to be doctors had to take an exam to receive a license. Saisei Gakusha, the predecessor of Nippon Medical School, was a cram school to pass the exam. Many famous doctors graduated from Saisei Gakusha, such as Hideyo Noguchi and Yayoi Yoshioka. The medical school was temporarily closed by the president of the school, Tai Hasegawa, in 1903. In 1904, the students and the faculties established the new Nippon Medical School. Kenzo Isobe became the president of the school. Then, Masatsugu Yamane, who was a member of House of Representatives, became its president and director.  

During the Taishō era, the Ministry of Education eventually permitted the new medical school.

At that time, there were three big private medical schools in Japan—Keio University School of Medicine, Jikei University School of Medicine and Nippon Medical School. Keio University became a university in 1920. Jikei University School of Medicine became a university in 1921. And, Nippon Medical School became a university in 1926. With only three private medical schools as universities in that era, they were regarded as "Shiritsu Idai Gosanke", the big three. 

During the World War II, Nippon Medical School was damaged by air raids between 1944 and 1945. The main hall which had built in the Taishō era was burned down in 1945. The first hospital of the Nippon Medical School which had built by the romanesque architecture style in the Taishō era was recently bulldozed.

Present
Nippon Medical School is one of the most famous private medical schools in Japan. Its entrance exam is highly competitive. 

The medical research level of the school is high. Nippon Medical School is very popular in Japan. Many famous medical doctors graduate from Nippon Medical School. The medical school has four hospitals: the main hospital, the Chiba Hokuso Hospital, the Tamanagayama Hospital and the Musashi Kosugi Hospital. 

Including national universities, Nippon Medical School is a celebrated medical school in Japan. Nippon Medical School officially says that Kenzo Isobe is the founder.

There are 617 students: 425 male and 192 female.

Saisei Gakusha and the successive medical schools

Nippon Medical School – Kenzo Isobe
Tokyo Medical University – Takuya Takahashi
Tokyo Women's Medical University – Yayoi Yoshioka

Establishment
1876 Saisei Gakusha
1904 Nippon Medical School

Campuses
Sendagi Campus: Sendagi Bunkyo-ku, Tokyo
Musashikosugi Campus: Kosugi-cho Nakahara-ku, Kanagawa

Academics

Undergraduate program
Doctor of Medicine degree (B.S)

Graduate program
PhD in Medicine degree (PhD)

Faculty
Professors: 83
Associate professors: 117
Full-time instructors: 148

Hospitals
Main Hospital - Sendagi Bunkyo-ku, Tokyo
Chiba Hokuso Hospital - Inzai-shi, Chiba
Musashi Kosugi Hospital - Kawasaki-shi, Kanagawa
Tama Nagayama Hospital　- Nagayama Tama-shi, Tokyo

Institutions attached to Nippon Medical School
Institution of Geriatrics
Institution of Vaccinational Therapy
Institution of NMR Research
Center of Information Science
Maruyama Memorial Vaccinational Therapy

Notable alumni
Hideyo Noguchi - scholar, Nobel Prize candidate
Katsusai Kohno - former director of Nippon Medical school
Hikaru Saeki - the first female star officer (admiral and general) of the Japan Self-Defense Forces (JSDF) and the first woman to head a JSDF hospital
Thomas Noguchi - physician, "Coroner to the Stars"
Nobuhito Koizumi - physician
Chisato Maruyama - former president of Nippon Medical School
Eitaka Tsuboi - physician, former Japan Medical Doctor's Association
Takashi Tajiri - current president of Nippon Medical School
Takehiko Kasuga - physician
Yayoi Yoshioka - physician
Yasuhiro Yamamoto - physician
Goro Kikuchi - professor at Tohoku University and former president of Nippon Medical School
Goro Asano - former president Nippon Medical School
Hideo Noriki - former president Nippon Medical School
Yoshitami Kimura - former president of Nippon Medical School
Hidetoshi Nishijima - politician, a member of House of Representatives
Sadayoshi Hatta - politician, former member of House of Representatives
Toshihisa Matsuzaki - professor at Ryukyu University
Kiyomi Maruki - founder of Saitama Medical University
Keijiro Yazawa - professor at the University of Hawaii
Yutaka Satoh - professor of the University of Iowa
Akiko Nishiyama - professor of the University of Connecticut
Fujima Hayashi - a poet
Toshifumi Otsuka - former director of Nippon Medical School
Sueo Takahashi - former director of Nippon Medical School
Freddie Matsukawa - a commentator for medicine
Junichi Nakagawa - physician
Kunihiko Ryo - composer
Takaaki Kameda - director of Kameda Medical Center
Shigeo Tanaka - former chairman of Second Department of Surgery, professor emeritus of Nippon Medical School

External links

  

Educational institutions established in 1876
Private universities and colleges in Japan
Universities and colleges in Tokyo
Bunkyō
1876 establishments in Japan
Medical schools in Japan